Maciej Stolarczyk (born 15 January 1972 in Słupsk) is a Polish professional football manager and former player who played as a defender. He is currently in charge of Ekstraklasa side Jagiellonia Białystok.

Career

National team
Stolarczyk made eight appearances for the Poland national team.

Honours

Club
Wisła Kraków
Ekstraklasa: 2002–03, 2003–04, 2004–05
Polish Cup: 2002–03

Manager career
In 2010, he became the head coach of Pogoń Szczecin. On 18 June 2018, Stolarczyk signed a one-year contract to become the manager of Wisła Kraków.

After initially taking charge of the U19 and U17 squads, on 15 October 2020 he was promoted to manage Poland U21. On 14 June 2022, after failing to qualify for the UEFA Under-21 Euro 2023, he was relieved of his duties. During his tenure, the U21 squad recorded seven wins, three draws and three losses.

On the same day, he was announced as the new manager of Ekstraklasa club Jagiellonia Białystok.

References

External links
 
 

1972 births
Living people
Sportspeople from Słupsk
Polish footballers
Poland international footballers
Association football defenders
Ekstraklasa players
I liga players
Pogoń Szczecin players
Widzew Łódź players
Wisła Kraków players
GKS Bełchatów players
Polish football managers
Pogoń Szczecin managers
Wisła Kraków managers
Jagiellonia Białystok managers
Ekstraklasa managers
I liga managers